The Little Shawmere River is a river in Sudbury District in northeastern Ontario, Canada. It is in the James Bay drainage basin, and is a left tributary of the Shawmere River.

The river flows from Murdock Lake in geographic Murdock Township and flows northeast into geographic Paul Township to its mouth at the Shawmere River. The Shawmere River flows via the Ivanhoe River, the Groundhog River, the Mattagami River and the Moose River to James Bay.

References

Sources

Rivers of Sudbury District